Pakistan participated in the 1982 Asian Games in New Delhi, India from  19 November to 4 December 1982. They won the gold medal in field hockey, defeating the hosts India in the final.

References

Pakistan also won 2 gold medals in sailing. OK Dinghy single handed class by Khalid Mahmood Akhtar  and Enterprise class by team of Byram and Goshpi Avari. Edited by Khalid Akhtar

Nations at the 1982 Asian Games
1982
Asian Games